Nisiturris angustissima is a species of sea snail, a marine gastropod mollusk in the family Pyramidellidae, the pyrams and their allies.

Distribution
This species occurs in the Gulf of Oman

References

 Robba E. (2013) Tertiary and Quaternary fossil pyramidelloidean gastropods of Indonesia. Scripta Geologica 144: 1-191.

External links
 Melvill, J. C. (1904). Descriptions of twenty-three species of Gastropoda from the Persian Gulf, Gulf of Oman, and Arabian sea, dredged by Mr. F. W. Townsend, of the Indo-European Telegraph Service, in 1903. Proceedings of the Malacological Society of London. 6(1): 51-60, pl. 5
 To World Register of Marine Species

Pyramidellidae
Gastropods described in 1904